Brødre i blodet (Brothers in blood) is a Norwegian novel by Ingvar Ambjørnsen, published in 1996.

See also
Elling

References

20th-century Norwegian novels
1996 novels